Originally launched in 1957 by HB Ice Cream (HB), the Golly Bar is an ice cream formerly sold exclusively in the Republic of Ireland. It was a single rectangular block of vanilla ice cream on a wooden stick. The packaging of Golly Bars depicted an image of a golliwog, a 19th-century caricature of a blackface minstrel, which is now regarded as racist. The golliwog image was removed from the packaging in 1992. However, continued concern over any references to the image saw a name change to the Giant Bar. 

Giant Bars remain available for purchase across the Republic of Ireland though reorganisation of the HB brand by corporate parent Unilever saw the production and ownership of the Giant Bar Brand move to Northern Ireland company Dale Farm.

See also
 List of frozen dessert brands

References

Brand name frozen desserts
Irish confectionery
Products introduced in 1957